The National War Labor Board, commonly the War Labor Board (NWLB or WLB) was an agency of the United States government established January 12, 1942 by executive order to mediate labor disputes during World War II.

History 
The NWLB was established by President Franklin D. Roosevelt under Executive Order 9017, with William Hammatt Davis as its chair.  It was charged with acting as an arbitration tribunal in labor-management dispute cases in order to prevent work stoppages which might hinder the war effort.  It administered wage control in national industries such as automobiles, shipping, railways, airlines, telegraph lines, and mining.

The Board was originally divided into twelve Regional Administrative Boards which handled both labor dispute settlement and wage stabilization functions for specific geographic regions.  The national Board further decentralized in 1943, when it established special tripartite commissions and panels to deal with specific industries on a national basis.

Roosevelt's successor Harry S. Truman issued Executive Order 9672 ceasing operations of the National War Labor Board on December 31, 1945.  Labor disputes were thereafter arbitrated by the National Labor Relations Board, the predecessor agency that had been set up in 1935.

References

External links 
 Guide to the United States NWLB files 1913-1945 at Cornell University Library
 Text of Executive Order 9017, establishing the National War Labor Board (World War II)
 Hearings before the Select Committee to Investigate Seizure of Montgomery Ward & Co.  U. S. House of Representatives, May 22 - June 8, 1944. - The testimony (pp. 2-74) of National War Labor Board Chairman William H. Davis before the committee on May 22, 1944, contains a great deal of information on the creation, organization, and practices of the WLB from its inception.

Government agencies established in 1942
1942 establishments in the United States
1945 disestablishments in the United States
Labor relations boards
Defunct independent agencies of the United States government
History of labor relations in the United States
Agencies of the United States government during World War II